Primula frenchii, French's shootingstar, is a species of flowering plant in the family Primulaceae. It is native to the central and southern United States, in southern Illinois, Indiana, Kentucky, Arkansas, and Alabama. It grows in moist, shady areas such as ledges near streams and under sandstone cliffs.

It was originally described as Dodecatheon meadia var. frenchii  in 1891, elevated to species in 1932, then moved to the genus Primula in 2007.

References

frenchii
Plants described in 1891
Flora of the United States